Heaven Knows What is a 2014 psychological drama film directed by Ben and Joshua Safdie and written by Ronald Bronstein and Joshua Safdie. The film stars Arielle Holmes, Buddy Duress, Ron Braunstein, Eleonore Hendricks, Caleb Landry Jones and Yuri Pleskun. The film was released on May 29, 2015, by RADiUS-TWC.  It is based on Mad Love in New York City, Holmes' unpublished memoir of her life as a homeless heroin addict living on the streets of New York City, where she was discovered by director Josh Safdie, who encouraged her to write the memoir.

The film is dedicated to Ilya Leontyev, Arielle Holmes' former boyfriend (portrayed the film by Caleb Landry Jones) who was found dead after a drug overdose in Central Park in April 2015.

Plot
Harley, a homeless heroin addict in New York City, has just been dumped by another homeless addict named Ilya for a recent infidelity, and he refuses to have anything to do with her. Desperate to win him back, Harley asks Ilya if he would love her if she died, and he coldly says yes. After buying razor blades with money earned from begging and being encouraged by Ilya, Harley slits one wrist before Ilya panics and calls an ambulance. Harley is admitted to a psychiatric hospital.

After her release, Harley meets up with her friend, Mike, a low-level drug dealer, and another man she met earlier named Skully. However, annoyed at Skully's harassment, Harley soon drives him away. She spends her time crashing with Mike and using him as a source for heroin. Eventually, Ilya and Mike get into a fight at a park with Harley watching, and Ilya injures Mike's hand. While he recovers from his wound, Harley admits to Mike that she still loves Ilya, which causes Mike to leave her in frustration.

One night, Harley receives a phone call; Ilya is unconscious at a fast-food restaurant from a drug overdose. Harley rushes there and revives Ilya, causing them to passionately reconcile. They then board a bus for Miami. While Harley is sleeping, Ilya gets off the bus alone and enters a vacant house. At night, the candle near his bed causes a fire, and Ilya dies after being enveloped in flames.

Harley wakes up on the bus and notices Ilya is not there. Devastated, she gets off the bus and goes back to New York. She goes to another fast-food restaurant, where Mike is recounting the story of a fight he was in. Harley silently sits with Mike and his friends as he tells his story.

Cast
Arielle Holmes as Harley Boggs
Buddy Duress as Mike
Necro as Skully
Eleonore Hendricks as Erica
Caleb Landry Jones as Ilya 
Yuri Pleskun as Tommy

Release
The film premiered at the 71st Venice International Film Festival on August 29, 2014. On October 1, 2014, RADiUS-TWC acquired the film.

Reception
Heaven Knows What received positive reviews from critics. On Rotten Tomatoes, the film has a rating of 87%, based on 68 reviews, with a rating of 7.4/10. The site's critical consensus reads, "Grueling and rewarding in equal measure, Heaven Knows What hits hard -- and serves as a powerful calling card for its captivating star, Arielle Holmes." On Metacritic, the film has a score of 75 out of 100, based on 22 critics, indicating "generally favorable reviews".

Kenji Fujishima of Slant Magazine described the film as "one of the most harrowing cinematic depictions of drug addiction in recent memory, reliant less on formal gimmickry than on close observation of behavior." Jordan Hoffman of The Guardian gave it 5 stars out of 5 and praised Arielle Holmes' performance, saying: "While her accent is reminiscent of Linda Manz, her energy recalls Gena Rowlands in the best of Cassavetes' films." The Film Poster designed by Sarah Holmes and Shiri Eshel for Market Reactive, was named by IndieWire as one of the 15 best Indie Movie Posters of 2015. It was called by IndieWire one of the best 25 movies of that year.

David Rooney of The Hollywood Reporter noted that "[among] the film's most impressive qualities is the Safdie brothers' boldly textural use of music — predominantly Isao Tomita's electronica versions of Debussy, but also a little Tangerine Dream and James Dashow as well as some hardstyle and black metal." Nicolas Rapold of The New York Times commented that "[the] director of photography, Sean Price Williams, skillfully orchestrates lingering close-ups and up-the-street long shots, which are beautifully interwoven in the editing by Ronald Bronstein and Benny Safdie."

It won the Grand Prix and the Best Director award at the 27th Tokyo International Film Festival.

References

External links
 

2014 films
2014 drama films
2014 independent films
2010s psychological drama films
American psychological drama films
Films about drugs
Films about heroin addiction
Films based on non-fiction books
Films directed by the Safdie brothers
Films set in New York (state)
Films shot in New York (state)
English-language French films
French psychological drama films
Films about self-harm
2010s English-language films
2010s American films
2010s French films